Richard William Gilmour Evans (born 17 February 1958, in Swansea), is a Welsh journalist and Broadcaster.

He was educated at Llanelli Boys Grammar Technical School, and studied Electrical Engineering at the University of Bath before studying journalism at City University, London.  He trained as a Newspaper reporter on the South Wales Argus before joining Radio West in Bristol, and then joining the BBC. He presented Newsbeat on BBC Radio One and was the news presenter on the Zoë Ball Breakfast show. He reported for the Today Programme, The World at One and PM and presented Summer School and Points of Law on BBC Radio Four and Breakfast, Drive, The Weekend News, The Midday news, Up All Night, After Hours, and Late Night Live on BBC Radio Five Live and until December 2008 the Radio Wales Phone In on BBC Radio Wales.

He lives in London and teaches journalism at City University London.

References

Sources 

1958 births
Living people
People from Llanelli
Alumni of the University of Bath
Alumni of City, University of London
Welsh journalists
Welsh radio presenters
Radio 5 Live